Sholom Reuven Feinstein (born August 1937) is an Orthodox Jewish rabbi and rosh yeshiva of the Yeshiva of Staten Island, New York. He is the youngest son of Rabbi Moshe Feinstein, the leading posek of post-war America.

Biography 

Rabbi Reuven Feinstein is the youngest of the four children of Rabbi Moshe and Shima (Sima) Feinstein and the only one to be born in America. His older siblings — Faye Gittel (deceased), Shifra (deceased), and Dovid (deceased) were all born in Lyuban, Russia (now part of Belarus), where Rabbi Moshe was the city's Rav until 1937.

Feinstein joined his father in establishing the Yeshiva of Staten Island in 1966. He has served as Rosh Yeshiva (head of school) of the yeshiva ever since. As did his late brother Dovid Feinstein, he upholds their late father's stance against an eruv for Manhattan.

Personal life
His wife, Shelia (Chava Sara) died on August 8, 2018 after suffering severe injuries in a motor vehicle accident. They both were in the car, and the incident "from she was originally expected to recover, occurred on July 24." They married "in the early 1960s." She had been a public school teacher, then a public school principal, and later on English principal of a girl's yeshiva. Her survivors included their children, and "grandchildren and great-grandchildren."

References

Further reading 

1937 births
Living people
20th-century American rabbis
21st-century American rabbis
American Haredi rabbis
Rosh yeshivas
People from Staten Island
Orthodox rabbis from New York City